John Moyer may refer to:

John Moyer (born 1973), American musician, bassist for the band Disturbed
John Moyer (American football) (born 1975), American football player in the Arena Football League
John Moyer (comedian) (born 1969), American comedian and screenwriter
John Gould Moyer (1893–1976), 31st governor of American Samoa
John A. Moyer (1922–2014), American politician in the state of Washington
John Moyer Heathcote (1834–1912), English barrister and real tennis player